Lorry Nkolo (born June 22, 1993) is a Congolese professional footballer who plays as a forward for DRB Tadjenanet in the Algerian Ligue Professionnelle 1.

Club career
In the summer of 2015, Nkolo signed a two-year contract with Algerian club DRB Tadjenanet, becoming the club's first ever foreign player.

Captain of his club team, CSM Diables Noirs, Nkolo was a leading goalscorer during the 2021 Congo Premier League season with 10 goals.

International career
In January 2014, coach Claude Leroy, invited him to be a part of the Congo squad for the 2014 African Nations Championship. The team was eliminated in the group stages after losing to Ghana, drawing with Libya and defeating Ethiopia.

References

1993 births
2014 African Nations Championship players
CSMD Diables Noirs players
DRB Tadjenanet players
Expatriate footballers in Algeria
Living people
Republic of the Congo footballers
Republic of the Congo expatriate footballers
Republic of the Congo international footballers
Republic of the Congo expatriate sportspeople in Algeria
Algerian Ligue Professionnelle 1 players
Association football forwards
Republic of the Congo A' international footballers